John Greig (1759–1819) was an English mathematician. He died at Somers Town, London, on 19 January 1819, aged 60.

Works
He taught mathematics and wrote:
 The Young Lady's Guide to Arithmetic, London, 1798; many editions, the last in 1864.
 Introduction to the Use of the Globes, 1805 ; three editions.
 A New Introduction to Arithmetic, London, 1805.
 A System of Astronomy on the simple plan of Geography, London, 1810.
 Astrography, or the Heavens displayed, London, 1810.
 The World displayed, or the Characteristic Features of Nature and Art, London, 1810.

References

Attribution

1759 births
1819 deaths
18th-century English mathematicians
19th-century English mathematicians
Mathematicians from London
18th-century English educators
19th-century English educators